The Lo Nuestro Award for Banda Artist of the Year  is an award presented annually by American network Univision. It was first awarded in 2001 and has been given annually since. The accolade was established to recognize the most talented performers of Latin music. The nominees and winners were originally selected by a voting poll conducted among program directors of Spanish-language radio stations in the United States and also based on chart performance on Billboard Latin music charts, with the results being tabulated and certified by the accounting firm Deloitte. At the present time, the winners are selected by the audience through an online survey. The trophy awarded is shaped in the form of a treble clef.

The award was first presented to Mexican band Banda el Recodo in 2001, they also hold the most wins and most nominations with 6 out of ten nominations. As of 2019, Mexican-American singer Jenni Rivera is the first and only female artist to have won the award, with her win in 2009.

Winners and nominees
Listed below are the winners of the award for each year, as well as the other nominees for the majority of the years awarded.

Multiple wins and nominations

See also
 Grammy Award for Best Banda Album
 Latin Grammy Award for Best Banda Album

References

Banda Artist of the Year
Banda musicians
Awards established in 2001